Anandapur is a town and a municipality of Kendujhar district  in the state of Odisha, India.

Toponymy 
The name Anandapur (called as A+nda+Pur) derives from आनन्द सहर which in Sanskrit means the "city of happiness". Once during the period of King (Raja) Govinda Bhanja it was known as Athagarh.

Geography
The town is situated on the bank of river Baitarani which flows on the southern side of the town. Madhubana is a well-known picnic place among the locals. The place like a small hill situated in the banks of Baitarani and has tall pine like trees. The scenic beauty of Madhubana attracts people from nearby small villages during New Year. Anandapur barrage attracts people.

Climate
Anandapur experiences three distinct seasons: summer, monsoon and winter. Typical summer months are from February to June, with maximum temperatures ranging from 35 °C to 45 °C. May is the warmest month in Anandapur, although summer doesn't end until May. The town often receives heavy thundershowers in May and the humidity level remains high. During the hottest months, the nights are usually very warm due to high humidity. The monsoon lasts from June to September, with moderate/high rainfall and temperatures ranging from 15 °C to 35 °C. Winter begins in October; the daytime temperature hovers around 28 °C (82 °F) while night temperature is below 15 °C for most of December and January.

Economy 
Most of the people depend on agriculture. Nowadays, most of people are inclined towards the business of transportation of iron ore mined from upper Keonjhar area meant for exports via Paradip Port through trucks and dumpers. Many of them are managing their livelihood by the means of small businesses. The most recent trend has been that many of younger generation are migrating to other states looking for jobs or opting for jobs in nearby steel plants of Kalinganagar (in neighbouring Jajpur district) after a degree or diploma in technical skill based education. As a result of all these, the per capita income of individuals has grown nowadays. Some people depend on businesses of handicraft and weaving. The town is known for its tasar silk handicraft. The political status is very complicated here and nowadays more and more people are being engaged in political and social works.

Heritage sites
Anandapur is situated in the strike line of coastal and hilly regions. It is surrounded by green hills and situated on the bank of river Baitarani which is a sacred river of India. Also known as Budha Ganga, it is considered one of the oldest rivers in India. During the ruling of Keshari dynasty in Odisha many temples of Shiva were constructed. Along the banks of this river many temples of Lord Shiva can be found. The Jhadeswara temple, Balunkeswara Temple, Uttareswara temple, Kundeswara temples and others are here. The Kushaleswara Temple was built by Jajati Keshari. However, the town is well known for its Jagannath Temple known as "Dadhibaman Temple" which is the main temple of the town; and the culture of the town is deeply influenced by the rituals of this temple.

Demographics
 India census, Anandapur had a population of 35,043. Males constituted 51% of the population and females 49%. Anandapur had an average literacy rate of 72%, higher than the national average of 59.5%; with 57% of the males and 43% of females literate. 12% of the population was under 6 years of age.

Administration 
The city of Anandapur is managed by the Anandapur Municipal Council (AMC). However, it is also a sub-division of Keonjhar district, hence there is a sub-divisional officer (SDO) who governs the overall city.

Politics
The MLA from Anandapur (SC) Assembly Constituency is Mayadhar Jena (BJD), who won the seat in State elections of 2014. He previously represented this area until 2004 through BJP and later has migrated to BJD. Former Odisha state congress president Jayadeb Jena had won earlier from here in 1995 and in 1985, and also as INC(I) candidate in 1980. He was previously the PCC president and secretary of PCC, Odisha. Bhagirathi Sethi of Biju Janata Dal had won in 2009, Dasarathi Jena of JD in 1990, and Makar Sethi of JNP in 1977.

Anandapur is part of Keonjhar (Lok Sabha constituency).

Culture and religion 
With addition to Ratha Jatra and Bahuda Jatra of the Dadhibaman Jagannath Temple, every year the people here celebrate the Baruni Jatra. While Deogaon is known for the Jagara (Maha Sivaratri) festival around the Kushaleswara Temple, Kantipal celebrates Dola Purnima (Holi). Kantipal Behera Sahi celebrates Gaja Laxmi Puja every year. Idols of goddess Laxmi is worshipped during this event. The event continues for 3–5 days, and a fair for it is set up in Anandapur during that period attracting people from nearby small villages.

Education 

 Anandapur College, Anandapur
 Anchalika Mahavidyalaya, Hatadihi
 Anandapur U.G.M.E. School (Model School)
 Anandapur UP School, Anandapur
 Balabhadra Narayana (B.N.) High School, Anandapur
 Brahmanidevi UP School, Anandapur
 Brajabandhu High School, Anandapur
 BT Women's College, Chhenapadi, Anadapur
 Govt. Girls High School, Anandapur
 Kanaka Manjari Women's College, Anandapur
 Saraswati Sishu Mandir, Anandapur
 KA Mohavidyalaya, Tarimul, Anandapur
 Fakirpur High School, Fakirpur
 Fakirpur Practicing primary School, Fakirpur
 Bodabil Primary School, Fakirpur
 Anandapur Regional B.Ed College, Fakirpur
 Fakirpur CT Training School, Fakirpur
 Fakirpur Govt. Girls' High School, Fakirpur
* Anchalik mahavidyalaya sadanga

Transport 
Ananadapur is connected by road from Bhubaneswar and Cuttack. NH-215 is the major national highway that runs through this area. The nearest railway station is Jajpur road. Buses and auto rickshaws run frequently from Anandapur to various surrounding rural villages. It is connected to Bhadrak and Baleswar by SH-53.

Places of tourist interest 
 At Hadagarh, the Salandi river flowing between two high mountains and a dam built over it are the main attractions for the tourists. This place is at a distance of 119 km from Keonjhar and 28 km from Anandapur town. Hadagarh is a reserved forest for elephants and tigers. It is near the Similipal National Park.
 Chakrateertha is about 3 km from Kantipal. It is known for its waterfall and scenery.
 Deogaon is known for the Kushaleswar Temple and the Pathara Bandha (stone embankment on the river Kusei).
 Along the riverbank many Siva temples were built by Keshri dynasty ruling the Odisha that time. The Siva temples are heritage sites and places for peace and devotion. They are Jhadeswar Temple, Uttareswar Temple, Balunkeswar Temple and Kundewar Temple.
 Balunkeswar Temple is situated in Village Fakirpur. It is one of the Buddhist site. Some of the idols have Buddhist culture imprints.
 Maa Gadachandi Temple is situated around Boula mountain near Sadha Chhak, 7 km From Chhenapadi Chhak, and 20 km from Anandpur. It is devotion of Maa Gadachandi, and it is a common place for picnics.
 Dargudisila is a tourist place in Anandapur. This is full of natural greenery sites and the river Baitarani flows through the hillside and stones around. This is a picnic and sightseeing spot. It is situated in a small village/hamlet called Dargudisila in Anandapur Tehsil in Kendujhar District of Odisha, India. It is located 59 km east of district headquarters Kendujhar, 26 km from Anandapur, and 154 km from state capital Bhubaneswar.

References

Cities and towns in Kendujhar district